Adventureland is the first text adventure video game for microcomputers, released by Scott Adams in 1978. The game involves searching for thirteen lost artifacts in a fantasy setting. Its success led Adams to form Adventure International, which went on to publish thirteen similar games in the Adventure series, each in different settings.

Gameplay 

Adventureland is controlled through the use of written commands. These can consist of a single word, such as those used for player character movement, including north, south, east, west, up, and down. They can also take the form of simple, two-word verb/noun phrases, such as "climb tree". Although the game can recognize about 120 words, the parser only takes the first three letters into account. This means not only that the parser occasionally misidentifies words, but also that commands can be truncated: "lig lam" would be interpreted as "light lamp".

In order to complete the game, the player has to collect the thirteen lost artifacts: A statue of Paul Bunyan's blue ox, Babe, the jeweled fruit, the golden fish, a dragon's egg, a golden net, a magic carpet, a diamond necklace, a diamond bracelet, a pot of rubies, the "royal honey", a crown, a magic mirror, and a "firestone".

Development
Adventureland, Adams' first program, is similar to the earlier Colossal Cave Adventure, though slightly scaled down in comparison. The source code for Adventureland was published in SoftSide magazine in 1980 and the database format was subsequently used in other interpreters such as Brian Howarth's Mysterious Adventures series.

Adventureland was written for the TRS-80, then ported to other systems, most of which didn't exist in 1978: Apple II, Atari 8-bit family, TI-99/4A, PET, VIC-20, Commodore 64, IBM PC, ZX Spectrum, BBC Micro, Acorn Electron, Dragon 32/64, and Exidy Sorcerer. A cut-down, three treasure version entitled Adventure 0: Special Sampler was also sold at a lower price.

In 1982, Adventureland was re-released with graphics, thus enabling the player to view visible representations of the scenery and objects.

Reception
Mark Herro for Dragon commented that "I can't recommend ANY version of Scott Adams' ADVENTURE series highly enough. Beg, borrow, or steal a chance to play ADVENTURE!!!!!"

References

External links
 "Adventureland game walkthrough part 1 commodore 64 version." YouTube, 15 February 2013, accessed 31 October 2020
 

1978 video games
1970s interactive fiction
Adventure games
Adventure International games
Apple II games
Atari 8-bit family games
BBC Micro and Acorn Electron games
Commercial video games with freely available source code
Commodore 64 games
Commodore PET games
VIC-20 games
DOS games
Dragon 32 games
TRS-80 games
Video games developed in the United States
ZX Spectrum games